Halls Town small place with no location listed in the unpublished manuscript.

Halls Town is located in the Port de Grave area.

Halls Town was a village south west of Bay Roberts. It had a population of 320 in 1956.

Halls Town is now a part of the town of North River.

See also
List of communities in Newfoundland and Labrador

Populated places in Newfoundland and Labrador